George Weston (March 23, 1864 – April 6, 1924) was an American-born Canadian businessman and the founder of George Weston Limited. He became Toronto's biggest baker with Canada's largest bread factory. Weston began his career at the age of 12 as a baker's apprentice and went on to become a bread route salesman. By the turn of the century, he was known throughout the city for his "Weston’s Home-Made Bread" and years later for "Weston’s Biscuits." In addition to being a successful local businessman, he was also a prominent Methodist, as well as a municipal politician who served four years as alderman on Toronto City Council.

Early years 

George Weston was born to Ann and William Weston at Oswego, New York, in 1864. By the time George turned four, the family, British immigrants who first settled in Canada, had returned to Toronto after some time in the United States. As one of eight children, George aspired to be a "minister of the Gospel" from an early age and, in fact, remained a devout Methodist throughout his life. But the family continued to struggle and funding any kind of higher education was beyond its means. On completing public school, George was sent out into the workforce, apparently to help supplement the family income.

Baker’s apprentice 

Young George was apprenticed to C.J. Frogley, a baker with a small shop at 850 Yonge Street, north of Bloor Street, then on the outskirts of Toronto in 1876. After a number of years, Frogley abandoned the location and another baker by the name of G.H. Bowen eventually set-up shop there. After a year or so, Bowen moved the bakery to Sullivan Street, not far from today's Art Gallery of Ontario. George found employment with Bowen, who is said to have taken enough interest in the lad to see that he "learned the business the way it should be learned." Over the course of his young career, George did everything from baking bread, to making deliveries, to keeping the books.

Sullivan Street bakery 

Eventually, George became a bread salesman and in 1882 went into business for himself, buying a bread route from Bowen. Two years later, with his business prospering, he bought out the bakery of his former employer. Years later, George Weston recalled those early days: "I baked 250 loaves the first day. I delivered them — drove my own waggon — called on every customer myself."

It was on Sullivan Street where George Weston, with one wood-burning oven and two journeymen bakers, developed his "Home-Made Bread." Made from a combination of the best Manitoba No. 1 Hard Wheat and Ontario Fall Wheat, "in about equal proportions,"  its popularity grew. In 1889, the bakery was still a small operation with two bread wagons but by 1894 it had undergone four expansions. He also began introducing the latest in technology, such as mechanical mixers, to make the process less labour-intensive. By the 1890s, he had renamed his bakery "G. Weston’s Bread Factory." Technological advances aside, Weston attributed the growth of his business to the quality of his bread. "Merit did it — the merit of my bread. You won't find any better bread than mine. Folks all like it. Every year adds new customers."

Model Bakery 

In the Fall of 1897, George Weston unveiled his new state-of-the-art "Model Bakery" bread factory at the corner of Soho and Phoebe streets in Toronto. The two-storey structure, with the latest in baking technology, had an initial production that averaged 3,200 loaves a day, and a capacity of 6,500 loaves. The press quickly hailed the operation for its efficiency and cleanliness, as well as gave credit to its proprietor:

Perseverance and pluck combined with brains have brought many a man out of the rut. Such a man is Mr. George Weston, who a few years ago, with a capital of two hundreds dollars, began a small baking business, and who to-day has the largest bakery in Canada, and does the largest bread business in the city. His quarters, being too small for his rapidly growing business, he decided to erect the largest, and at the same time the model, bakery in Canada. He spared no money, and let it be said to his credit, that the building was designed and built by Canadians, and is composed of and equipped with Canadian material and machinery. The fault of many bakers was that their surroundings were not clean enough, and Mr. Weston decided that the fame of his genuine home-made bread should not suffer through any lack of cleanliness. Though bakery, house and stables are under one roof, the building is so constructed that one does not affect the others.

But no sooner had the Model Bakery gone into production than George Weston began hearing reports from his salesmen that the competition was undercutting his prices, contrary to a local Bakers’ Association agreement that set a standard price for bread of 12 cents a loaf. As Weston parted company with his fellow bakers he lowered his prices for both his route and wholesale customers, as the competition attempted to fill the store shelves of Toronto with their bread:
  Bakers have fallen out with one another since Mr. Geo Weston has left their ASSOCIATION and the outcome will be the bakers' loss and the citizens' gain. Mr. Geo. Weston has lowered his bread to 10 cents retail, CASH, and he promises to continue such prices all through the winter, no matter what the other BAKERS do. His aim is to satisfy the public that his drop in price is genuine, and not a BLUFF on the public which is being introduced by many of the leading bakers in the city, charging their private customers 11 and 12 cents and selling to the stores at 6 cents per loaf. Mr. Weston does not intend to be governed by any ring or association in the future, but will attend strictly to his own business. which has made Mr. G. WESTON'S name a household word with the citizens of Toronto for his SUPERIOR REAL HOME MADE BREAD. He promises to treat all classes alike, one quality for the rich, the same for the poor. No half dozen prices with Mr. Geo. Weston. His wholesale price will be from day to day 9 cents to stores, 10 cents to privates, CASH.

In the end, the price war did not hurt business. By 1899, in a single month, the Model Bakery delivered 231,650 three pound loafs, more than double the factory's original output, with bread now shipped to 38 cities and towns outside of Toronto. Two years later, the Model Bakery was supplying over 100 towns across Ontario with its bread, "as far east as Prescott, as far west as Windsor, and up to North Bay."

Amalgamation 

In 1901, George Weston merged his operations with those of flour mill owner J.L. Spink of Pickering, Ontario, to form the Model Bakery Company, Limited.

In a letter to the editor, Weston addressed rumors concerning a "bread trust" designed to control the bread business of Toronto, saying they were without baseless and that the amalgamation was intended to do away with "the middle man's profits" in order to give the public better value for their money, while ensuring that the Model Bakery received "nothing but the
very choicest flour with which to make our bread."

By late 1902, the Pickering News gave every indication that the merger had been a success:

Those of our readers who have not paid a visit to The Model Bakery at Toronto, should do so at the first opportunity, as there they see the manufacturing of bread done on a collossal scale, can you imagine for a minute what it means to bake a million pounds, (1,000,000) of bread each month, which is 12,000,000 lbs. a year. This is what The Model Bakery has done this year, and their trade is increasing to such an extent, that they are building three more ovens of the most improved kind, as well as extending their cake department. 'Weston's Bread' is delivered daily to all parts of the city and surrounding country, also shipped all over Ontario, as well as to points in Quebec. Their Bakery is supplied by flour entirely from the company's own mill, better known as Spink Mill's, which is located at Pickering, on the main line of the Grand Trunk Railway. Their Mills are kept running night and day to keep the Bakery and their other trade supplied, the Bakery taking some 40,000 barrels of flour a year. 

But the partnership, for reasons unknown, did not last. After a few years the mill assets were returned to Spink and Weston and his business partner went their separate ways.

During this time, George Weston was also active in terms of professional associations. At the first annual Canadian Master Bakers' Association, held September 1902 in Toronto, he delivered the concluding address on the topic of 'Bookkeeping methods as applied to the baking trade,' in which he "introduced several new ideas," illustrated by a chart.

From bread to biscuits 

Early in the new century, Weston began moving beyond bread into biscuits. The bread business had always been very competitive and margins were low, while biscuits offered higher margins. In addition to 'fancy biscuits,' or what today would be called cookies, the company made sodas. A 1904 advertisement boasted that the new Weston's Royal Cream Soda Biscuits were the only ones in Canada sold in air-tight packaging. Within a few years, the Model Bakery Co., Limited, had a dozen "Ontario biscuit travellers" or salesman, offering Weston's Biscuits to merchants.

In 1911, George Weston's bread business underwent another amalgamation, this time on a larger scale, joining with other manufacturers in Toronto, Montreal and Winnipeg, to form the Canada Bread Company. In merging their businesses the Canada Bread partners agreed not to compete with the new company they had created by refraining from making bread for a ten-year period. The Model Bakery became part of the assets of Canada Bread and George Weston became a company director. Meantime, a new "Weston's Biscuit Factory," at the corner of Peter and Richmond streets in Toronto, went into production.

Municipal politics 

In addition to being a prominent business figure churchman, and "a liberal contributor to worthy charities," George Weston also became a municipal politician, winning election as alderman on Toronto city council. Weston, who in one campaign ad promoted himself as "The Businessman's Candidate,"  served four successive one-year terms representing Ward Four from 1910 to 1913. Described as a "progressive legislator"  by the press, who voiced his support for a proposed "tubes" or subway system, he each year received the endorsement of the city's newspapers. One such endorsement noted that "Alderman Weston is not a noisy member of council but a useful one." While urged to run for mayor he turned down the idea in favour of one last term on council. In 1914, he returned full-time to his business, which had apparently suffered in his absence.

World war 

With World War I being fought in Europe, supply shortages forced the company to discontinue some lines of biscuits but George Weston Limited struggled through and remained profitable. The company also played a part in the war effort, supplying biscuits to Canadian troops overseas. One photograph, taken in front of the Weston's Biscuit Factory, showed delivery wagons with banners that read, "For Our Soldier Boys Fighting in France." The war also personally touched George Weston and family, with eldest son Garfield volunteering for overseas duty as a "Sapper" in the Canadian Expeditionary Force from 1917 to 1919. While in uniform Garfield toured the world-famous British biscuit factories and came away convinced that a similar, high quality product could be successfully manufactured and marketed in Canada.  

It was also during this time that George Weston considered selling the company. Distraught over the death of his youngest son in a tragic accident and not sure his eldest son would return from the trenches of France, he received an offer from competitor Christie, Brown and Company to buy George Weston Limited. Not knowing what to do, he wrote to Garfield asking for his advice. Garfield wrote back, asking his father not to sell and telling him to hold on until his return from the war.

English Quality Biscuits 

On his return from war in 1919, Garfield Weston rejoined his father's firm and he soon began taking on managerial responsibilities, first promoted to company vice president and then general manager. In 1921, with the ten-year agreement barring the company from manufacturing bread having expired, and at the urging of former customers of his, George Weston went back to baking bread. It was around this time that Garfield convinced his father to import biscuit ovens and machinery from England. The result was the successful launch of "Weston’s English Quality Biscuits" in 1922. The new line sold for about half of the price of imported English biscuits. Two months later, the company reported its production line working 24 hours a day, trying to keep up with demand. It soon began adding additional varieties of biscuits to the new line, promoted with the slogan, "Biscuits as They Are Made in England."

Death 
George Weston died from a stroke in April 1924, when he was 60. 

With the death of George Weston, W. Garfield Weston became president of George Weston Limited. He soon began a program of expansion and acquisition.

In October 2008, the Ontario Heritage Trust unveiled a provincial plaque commemorating George Weston at the site of his former Model Bakery bread factory in Toronto.

References

 Filey, Mike Mount Pleasant Cemetery (1990) Firefly Books 
 George Weston at the Canadian Dictionary of Biography online

1864 births
1924 deaths
Canadian Methodists
Businesspeople from New York (state)
Businesspeople from Toronto
People from Oswego, New York
Toronto city councillors
People from Old Toronto
George